Presidential elections were held in Ecuador in 1856. The elections were held using an electoral college, and resulted in a victory for Francisco Robles, who received 60% of the vote. He took office on 1 September.

Results

References

Presidential elections in Ecuador
Ecuador
1856 in Ecuador
Election and referendum articles with incomplete results